William Gill Bailey was a politician in Queensland, Australia. He was a Member of the Queensland Legislative Assembly.

Personal history

He was born at East Teignmouth, Devonshire, England. Addition information on his life prior to election to Parliament is available.

Electoral history

He was elected at a By-election as the member for Wide Bay. He served four terms during the period 12 November 1873 – 17 May 1888. During Sir S.W.Griffith's last administration Mr. Bailey served as Government Whip.

Post-electoral life

He retired to Brisbane after his time in the Legislative Assembly and died at his residence in Qualtrough Street Woolloongabba, Brisbane on 23 April 1889. He is buried at Toowong Cemetery, Brisbane, Queensland.

Obituary
Death of Mr W. G. Bailey

References

Members of the Queensland Legislative Assembly
1833 births
1889 deaths
People from Queensland
Burials at Toowong Cemetery
19th-century Australian politicians